Deliver Us from Evil is a 2014 American supernatural horror film directed by Scott Derrickson and produced by Jerry Bruckheimer. The film claims to be based on a 2001 non-fiction book entitled Beware the Night by Ralph Sarchie and Lisa Collier Cool, and its marketing campaign highlighted that it was "inspired by actual accounts", however the plot is an original piece written by director Derrickson. The film stars Eric Bana, Édgar Ramírez, Sean Harris, Olivia Munn, and Joel McHale in the main roles and was released on July 2, 2014. The film grossed $87.9 million against a $30 million budget.

Plot
In The Bronx in 2013, veteran NYPD Special Operations Sergeant Ralph Sarchie and his partner Butler patrol the 46th Precinct. A domestic disturbance call comes in over the radio. Sarchie finds out that the male at the address is a former Marine. 
At the site of the complaint, Sarchie and Butler encounter the former Marine, Jimmy Tratner, whose wife has been badly beaten. They also notice deep scratches on the floor. Tratner flees. Sarchie catches up and makes the arrest. The officers assume that Jimmy is mentally ill or high on drugs. 
Sarchie and Butler are called to the Bronx Zoo after a woman has thrown her toddler into the moat surrounding the lion enclosure. They find the woman in the lemur pen. She is furiously scraping at the ground and rapidly recites the lyrics to "Break On Through (To the Other Side)". Sarchie notices a commercial painter inside the lion enclosure. He enters to interrogate the man, but is attacked by the lions and barely escapes.
 
When the deranged woman, Jane Crenna, is transferred to a mental health facility, a Jesuit priest, Mendoza, arrives at the family's request. Another domestic disturbance call comes in; a family of three have been staying in the living room after a series of strange disturbances. There is one area of the house where light bulbs instantly burn out and candles will not remain lit. The family explains that there were two painters working the basement, where most of the disturbances occurred. In the basement, Sarchie discovers the decomposing body of one of the painters, David Griggs. At Griggs' decayed apartment, they find business cards for Alphonsus Painting company as well as a picture of Griggs with Jane Crenna and the child that she threw at the zoo. In another picture, Griggs is pictured in his Marine uniform with Jimmy and a third Marine, Mick Santino. They realize Santino must have been the painter at the zoo.

Mendoza believes that Jane is possessed by demons. He explains that there is secondary evil created by humans and primary evil which comes from demons. Sarchie is skeptical, but when he reviews the surveillance footage, he hears strange noises and sees things that Butler does not. Sarchie returns to Jimmy Tratner's house and finds a wall that was being painted. He scrapes away the paint to find a pictograph of an owl. At Sarchie's home, his daughter is awakened by strange noises. Sarchie scrapes off the paint to find a bizarre mix of Latin and ancient pictographs. He finds hard drives with footage from Tratner's deployments and watches the footage from the palm grove in Diyala. In a cave, the soldiers found a carving of the same message that is on the wall in Tratner's home. Sarchie revisits the basement where he found Griggs' body, scrapes off the paint, and finds the message again. He reviews the zoo surveillance footage and sees the same message was being painted over by Santino in the lion enclosure. With Mendoza, he visits Jane Crenna in the hospital but she savagely bites his already wounded forearm.

Mendoza decodes the message as a kind of bridge between Christian and pagan theology which would allow demons a door to the human world. He explains that certain people are more susceptible to such messages than others. He suggests that the voices and images Sarchie is seeing could be a result of his intuitive "radar", which means that he is also susceptible to the archaic message. Mendoza goes with Sarchie and Butler to an apartment building where they are attacked by Santino and Jimmy Tratner. Tratner is subdued by Mendoza's cross. Santino kills Butler. 
At Sarchie's home, his daughter sees her stuffed owl advance towards her bed. As she runs screaming, she sees Santino in the hallway. Sarchie arrives and Santino warns that he has abducted Sarchie's wife and daughter. Santino is brought to the precinct where Mendoza and Sarchie perform an exorcism on him. Sarchie's wife and daughter are located in an Alphonsus Painting van at a storage facility. The film ends with the baptism of the Sarchies' second child.

Cast
 Eric Bana as Ralph Sarchie, a New York City street cop who has put his faith in religion behind him, only to find himself entangled with the devil.
 Édgar Ramírez as Mendoza, the Spanish priest who teams with Ralph.
 Olivia Munn as Jen Sarchie, Ralph’s wife, who also has a tie to the case.
 Sean Harris as Mick Santino/Jungler, a marine possessed by demons, who ends up targeting Ralph and his loved ones.
 Joel McHale as Butler, Ralph’s partner, a tough, experienced (yet sometimes a bit egotistical) cop.
 Chris Coy as Jimmy Tratner
 Dorian Missick as Gordon
 Lulu Wilson as Christina Sarchie, Ralph's daughter.
 Scott Johnsen as Lt. Griggs
 Daniel Sauli as Salvatore
 Antoinette Lavecchia as Serafina
 Aidan Gemme as Mario
 Jenna Gavigan as Lucinda
 Oliver Wadsworth as Marvin
 Mike Houston as Nadler
 Olivia Horton as Jane Crenna
 Rhona Fox as Zookeeper
 Valentina Rendón as Claudia

Production
On September 4, 2012, director Scott Derrickson signed on to direct a paranormal cop thriller film he co-wrote with Paul Harris Boardman, with Screen Gems producing. On November 12, Jerry Bruckheimer signed on to produce the film with his Jerry Bruckheimer Films production company, which had begun developing a treatment of the Sarchie book years earlier. David Ayer, Bryan Bertino and Bruce C. McKenna also worked on the screenplay before Bruckheimer went back to Derrickson. Screen Gems set a January 16, 2015, release date and announced it would start filming on May 20, in The Bronx, New York City. On November 13, 2013, Sony Pictures changed the release date from January 2015 to July 2, 2014. On December 7, the film was retitled from Beware the Night to Deliver Us from Evil.

The film features a completely original plot by Derrickson and co-writer Paul Harris Boardman, while it draws on certain passages of Sarchie's book. Mendoza's explanation of primary and secondary evil is culled from the book's preface. Many of the details from the scene where Sarchie and Butler encounter the family living in one room of a haunted house are taken directly from the first chapter of the book.

Casting
Initially, Mark Wahlberg was set to star. On November 9, 2012 The Wrap posted that Eric Bana was in talks to join the film, playing the lead role as a New York cop. On April 9, 2013 Bana confirmed his role in the film as a Catholic cop, and Olivia Munn and Édgar Ramírez were set to co-star as the cop's wife and a priest respectively. On May 28, 2013 Joel McHale and Sean Harris also joined the film; McHale played Bana's partner, a tough and experienced cop. Dorian Missick joined cast on June 5 to play the role of the cop Gordon. Other cast members include Chris Coy, Rhona Fox, and Valentina Rendón.

Filming
Principal photography began on June 3, 2013 in New York City. After wrapping up filming in New York in the end of July, production moved to Abu Dhabi at the start of August 2013. Production filmed scenes at the Liwa Oasis desert in Abu Dhabi. According to Empire State Development Corporation, Deliver Us from Evil spent more than $19 million in New York state over the course of its 34-day shoot in New York City and on Long Island. The production paid $7 million to New York residents, hiring some 700 cast and crew as well as more than 400 extras.

Marketing
On December 23, 2013, the first photo from the film was released. The film's first trailer was released on YouTube on March 7, 2014, followed by another international trailer on April 10. On May 14 another trailer was released.

Release

The film was released on July 2, 2014 in 3,049 locations in the United States.

Critical reception
The film holds an approval rating of 29% on Rotten Tomatoes based on 122 reviews, with an average rating of 4.7/10. The critical consensus states: "Director Scott Derrickson continues to have a reliably firm grasp on creepy atmosphere, but Deliver Us from Evils lack of original scares is reflected in its shopworn title." On Metacritic, the film has a weighted average score of 40 out of 100 based on 32 critics, indicating "mixed or average reviews".

Writing for Variety, Andrew Barker's review called it "a professionally assembled genre mashup that's too silly to be scary, and a bit too dull to be a midnight-movie guilty pleasure".  Critic Peter Keough of The Boston Globe wrote that the film is atmospheric but "the story soon devolves into variations of many movies we have seen before".  Bilge Ebiri of New York Magazine called it "a thoroughly generic exorcism film" and concluded, "There are some half-decent scares... But the film's real problem is that it's somehow both one-note and convoluted."  Ben Sachs wrote in The Chicago Reader that Derrickson "demonstrates a knack for atmosphere but little sense of pacing".  Of the film's atmosphere, Sachs wrote that "some sequences are effectively spooky" but "just as many feel uninspired".  Moira Macdonald of The Seattle Times described it as "a pretty routine and occasionally silly demonic-possession flick, which distinguishes itself by making us wait so long for the exorcism that heads may be spinning in the audience as well".  Macdonald added, "Some of it's shivery, but a lot of it is familiar from similar movies."  Rafer Guzman of Newsday wrote, "Thanks to a fine cast, solid direction by Scott Derrickson and an idiosyncratic soundtrack by The Doors, the movie's mandatory cliches – Latin invocations, gurgling demons – are far more tolerable than usual."  Bill Stamets in The Chicago Sun Times stated, "Director Scott Derrickson and his co-writer, Paul Harris Boardman, deliver a routine procedural with unremarkable frights".

Box office
Deliver Us from Evil did well at the box office. It had earned $2.8 million on its opening day. In its opening weekend, the film earned $9.5 million ranking at number four at the box office in the United States, behind the box office champion, Transformers: Age of Extinction.

References

External links

 
 
 
 
 

2014 films
2014 horror films
2010s crime thriller films
American biographical films
American crime thriller films
American supernatural horror films
Films about domestic violence
Demons in film
Films scored by Christopher Young
Films directed by Scott Derrickson
Films produced by Jerry Bruckheimer
Films about Christianity
Films about exorcism
Films about religion
Films based on non-fiction books
Films set in 2010
Films set in 2013
Films set in Iraq
Films set in New York City
Films shot in New York City
Films shot in the United Arab Emirates
Religious horror films
Screen Gems films
2010s English-language films
2010s American films